Malek Al-Shlouh (born 31 December 1983) is a Jordanian footballer who was a defender for That Ras.

References

External links 
 

1983 births
Living people
Jordanian footballers
Association football defenders
That Ras Club players
Al-Ramtha SC players
People from Al Karak